During the 1986–87 English football season, Luton Town F.C. competed in the Football League First Division and finished seventh, the best league position in the club's history to date.

Season summary
Manager David Pleat had left Luton at the end of the previous season to become manager of Tottenham Hotspur, and was replaced by former Luton defender John Moore. Under Moore, Luton enjoyed one of the best seasons in their history, finishing in seventh, their highest-ever placing in the top flight. However, Moore resigned at the end of the season, claiming he did not feel management was the right career for him. He was replaced by his assistant manager Ray Harford.

Perhaps the only negative of the season was Luton being banned from competing in the League Cup due to the club's controversial scheme, introduced by chairman David Evans, to only admit club members and refusal to admit away fans.

Kit
Luton retained the kit worn by the club for the previous two seasons, manufactured by German apparel manufacturers Adidas and sponsored by Bedford.

Squad

League table

See also
 List of Luton Town F.C. seasons
 1986–87 Football League
 1986–87 FA Cup

References

1986-87
Luton Town